The 2009–10 IWBL League was the ninth season of the WABA League. The study included ten teams from five states, and the winner has become the team Gospić Croatia Osiguranje. In this season participating clubs from Serbia, Montenegro, Bosnia and Herzegovina, Croatia and from Slovenia.

IWBL League for the season 2009–10 has begun to play 10 October 2009 and ended on 22 February 2010, when he it was completed a Regular season. Final Four to be played from 12–13 March 2010. in Gospić, Croatia. Winner Final Four this season for the team Gospić Croatia Osiguranje from Croatia.

Team information

Regular season 
The League of the season was played with 10 teams and play a dual circuit system, each with each one game at home and away. The four best teams at the end of the regular season were placed in the Final Four. The regular season began on 10 October 2009 and it will end on 20 February 2010.

Final four 
Final Four to be played from 12–13 March 2010. in the Gradska Školska Sportska Dvorana in Gospić, Croatia.

Awards 
 Player of the Year: Jelena Ivezić (184-G-84) of Gospić Croatia Osiguranje 
 Guard of the Year: Jelena Ivezić (184-G-84) of Gospić Croatia Osiguranje 
 Forward of the Year: Mirna Mazić (188-F-85) of Medveščak 
 Center of the Year: Natalia Terglav Tratsiak (195-C-80) of HIT Kranjska Gora 
 Import Player of the Year: Carla Thomas (191-F/C-85) of Gospić Croatia Osiguranje 
 European Player of the Year: Jelena Ivezić (184-G-84) of Gospić Croatia Osiguranje 
 Defensive Player of the Year: Mirna Mazić (188-F-85) of Medveščak 
 Coach of the Year: Stipe Bralić of Gospić Croatia Osiguranje 

1st Team
 G: Jelena Ivezić (184-84) of Gospić Croatia Osiguranje 
 G: Anda Jelavić (175-80) of Gospić Croatia Osiguranje 
 F: Mirna Mazić (188-85) of Medveščak 
 F/C: Carla Thomas (191-85) of Gospić Croatia Osiguranje 
 C: Natalia Terglav-Tratsiak (195-80) of HIT Kranjska Gora 

2nd Team
 G: Brankica Hadžović (175-81) of Jedinstvo Bijelo Polje 
 F: Lamisha Augustine (186-82) of Gospić Croatia Osiguranje 
 F: Stanecia Graham (185-86) of Jedinstvo Bijelo Polje 
 F/C: Nikya Hughes (191-85) of Merkur Celje 
 C: Emina Demirović (186-85) of Mladi Krajišnik 

Honorable Mention
 Ljubica Kure (178-G-81) of AJM Maribor 
 Eva Komplet (182-F/C-86) of HIT Kranjska Gora 
 Luca Ivanković (200-C-87) of Šibenik Jolly 
 Nataša Popović (190-C-82) of Šibenik Jolly 
 Jasmina Bigović (174-G-79) of Jedinstvo Bijelo Polje 

All-European Players Team
 G: Jelena Ivezić (184-84) of Gospić Croatia Osiguranje 
 G: Anda Jelavić (175-80) of Gospić Croatia Osiguranje 
 F: Mirna Mazić (188-85) of Medveščak 
 F/C: Eva Komplet (182-86) of HIT Kranjska Gora 
 C: Natalia Terglav Tratsiak (195-80) of HIT Kranjska Gora

External links 
 2009–10 IWBL League at Eurobasket.com

2009-10
2009–10 in European women's basketball leagues
2009–10 in Serbian basketball
2009–10 in Bosnia and Herzegovina basketball
2009–10 in Slovenian basketball
2009–10 in Montenegrin basketball
2009–10 in Croatian basketball